Irina Nikolaevna Laricheva (born 1963) is a retired Soviet swimmer who won a bronze medal in the 400 m freestyle at the 1983 European Aquatics Championships. The same year she won five gold medals at the Universiade. She missed the 1984 Summer Olympics due to their boycott by the Soviet Union and competed at the alternate Friendship Games instead, winning two medals in the 400 m and 800 m freestyle events.

She works as a sports coach in Grodno, Belarus, and competes in the masters category.

References

1963 births
Living people
Soviet female freestyle swimmers
European Aquatics Championships medalists in swimming
Universiade medalists in swimming
Sportspeople from Novosibirsk
Universiade gold medalists for the Soviet Union
Universiade silver medalists for the Soviet Union
Universiade bronze medalists for the Soviet Union
Medalists at the 1981 Summer Universiade
Medalists at the 1983 Summer Universiade